Pivot may refer to:
Pivot, the point of rotation in a lever system
More generally, the center point of any rotational system
Pivot joint, a kind of joint between bones in the body
Pivot turn, a dance move

Companies
Incitec Pivot, an Australian chemicals and explosives manufacturer
Pivot Legal Society, a legal advocacy organization based in Vancouver, British Columbia
Pivot Wireless, a cell phone service, created by a joint venture between Sprint and multiple cable companies

Computing
Apache Pivot, an open-source platform for building applications in Java
Microsoft Live Labs Pivot, a data search application
Morrow Pivot and Morrow Pivot II, early laptop computers
Pivot, an element of the quicksort algorithm
Pivot, now PivotX, a content management system designed for bloggers
Pivot display, a display which can change orientation
Pivot Stickfigure Animator, stick-figure animation software
Pivot table, a data summarization tool in spreadsheets
Pivotal Games, a former UK video game developer
Pivoting, a computer security exploit used by hackers to use a compromised computer for attacks

Linguistics
Syntactic pivot, the argument of the verb around which the sentence revolves
Pivot language, an artificial or natural language used as an intermediary language for translation

Mathematics
Pivot element, a non-zero element of a matrix selected by an algorithm
Pivotal quantity, in statistics

Music
Pivot (U.S. band), an American rock band
Pivot, the former name of the experimental rock band PVT
Pivot (album), by Amoeba
Pivot chord, a chord that is diatonic to more than one key or, in other words, is common to two keys

Places
Mount Pivot, a mountain in the western part of the Shackleton Range
 Pivot Area or Heartland, the theme of The Geographical Pivot of History
Pivot Peak, the highest point in Wilkniss Mountains, Victoria Land

Sports
Pivot, a player position in futsal
Pivot, a player position in roller derby
Pivot, a player position in team handball
Pivot, another term for five-eighth, one of the rugby league positions
Pivot, another term for fly-half, one of the rugby union positions
Pivot or center (basketball), a player position in basketball
Pivot turn (skiing), a technique of turning in place in skiing
In baseball, the action of a second baseman on an infield double play in making the turn from catching to throwing

Other uses
Pivot, a lean startup method for developing businesses and products by changing direction
Pivot point (stock market), a price point in the financial, commodity, and securities markets
Pivot (card game), a casual card game released by Wizards of the Coast in 1998
Kakekotoba, or pivot word, a technique in Japanese poetry
Bernard Pivot (born 1935), French journalist
 "The Geographical Pivot of History" by H.J. Mackinder
Pivot (TV network), a defunct American digital cable and satellite television network
USS Pivot

See also 
 Center pin
 Pivotal (disambiguation)